Enrique Chevalier Chardón (c. 1856 – 19 July 1931) was the Mayor of Ponce, Puerto Rico, in 1902.

Background
Chevalier Chardón was born in Ponce around 1856. His parents were Juan Felix Chevalier and Ramona A. Chardón. He married Antonia Valdivieso Ortiz with whom Chevalier Chardón had a daughter named Antonia. He died in Ponce on 19 July 1931. A member of the Partido Republicano Puertorriqueño, Chevalier had also been a member of the Ponce municipal assembly before becoming mayor.

Mayoral term
In 1902, the Puerto Rico Legislature approved a law that annexed the municipality of Guayanilla to the municipality of Ponce. As such, during his one year as mayor of Ponce, Mayor Chevalier was effectively the mayor of both Ponce and Guayanilla. The law was repealed in 1905. In terms of medical care, Chevalier is also credited with establishing the position for a municipal physician to care for the medical needs of residents in the growing Barrio Playa. The municipal ordinance established that the person occupying such position was to be a resident of that barrio. While he was a member of the Partido Republicano Puertorriqueño, his mayoral term was marked by an ayuntamiento led by the opposition, the Union of Puerto Rico party.

See also
List of mayors of Ponce, Puerto Rico
List of Puerto Ricans

References

Further reading
 Fay Fowlie de Flores. Ponce, Perla del Sur: Una Bibliográfica Anotada. Second Edition. 1997. Ponce, Puerto Rico: Universidad de Puerto Rico en Ponce. p. 332. Item 1655. 
 Ponce. Oficina del Alcalde. Al pueblo de Ponce y el Hon. Gobernador de Puerto Rico. Tipografía Baldorioty. 1902-1906. (Universidad de Puerto Rico - Rio Piedras.)

1850s births
1931 deaths
Mayors of Ponce, Puerto Rico